Citioica is a genus of moths in the family Saturniidae.

Species
The genus includes the following species:

Citioica anthonilis (Herrich-Schäffer, 1854) — Ecuador, Mexico
Citioica guyaensis Brechlin & Meister, 2011
Citioica homonea (Rothschild, 1907) — Ecuador
Citioica rubrocanescens Brechlin & Meister, 2011

References
Citioica at Markku Savela's Lepidoptera and Some Other Life Forms

Ceratocampinae